Phillip Island Nature Park (PINP) is a conservation park located on Phillip Island, Victoria, Australia. Created in 1996, the park is owned by the Victorian State Government, however it is a self-funding commercial attraction for the purpose of animal conservation and research.

An oil spill off the island in January, 2000 led to a worldwide appeal for hand knit penguin sweaters.

Located 1.5 hours drive south of Melbourne, PINP covers several separate areas over 1805 hectares. The parks include Pyramid Rock, Rhyll Inlet, Seal Rocks, and Cape Woolamai, with specific viewing and attraction areas that include the Nobbies Centre (seals, dolphins, and shark viewing), the Penguin Parade (little penguins coming ashore at dusk), Koala Conservation Centre, and the Churchill Island Heritage Farm. 

Phillip Island’s Penguin Parade is the only commercial venue in the world where you can see penguins in their own environment and attracts tourists from different parts of the world. The Koala Conservation Centre is dedicated to koala research and conservation and allows the opportunity to view koalas in their natural habitat on treetop boardwalks.

Much of the park lies within the Phillip Island Important Bird Area, so identified by BirdLife International because of its importance in supporting significant populations of little penguins, short-tailed shearwaters and Pacific gulls.

Gallery

References

External links

Parks in Victoria (Australia)
Phillip Island
1996 establishments in Australia